This is a list of Mexican football transfers for the 2020 summer transfer window, grouped by club. It includes football transfers related to clubs from the Liga BBVA MX. This list no longer includes clubs from the Ascenso MX, as the league was abolished on April 24, 2020 due to the 2019–20 coronavirus pandemic and the league's lack of financial resources.

Liga BBVA MX

América

In:

Out:

Atlas

In:

Out:

Atlético San Luis

In:

Out:

Cruz Azul

In:

Out:

Guadalajara

In:

Out:

Juárez

In:

Out:

León

In:

Out:

Mazatlán

In:

Out:

Monterrey

In:

Out:

Necaxa

In:

Out:

Pachuca

In:

Out:

Puebla

In:

Out:

Querétaro

In:

Out:

Santos Laguna

In:

Out:

Tijuana

In:

Out:

Toluca

In:

Out:

UANL

In:

Out:

UNAM

In:

Out:

Notes

References 

Summer 2020
Mexico
Tran